Live at the Marquee is the first live album by American progressive metal band Dream Theater, recorded at London's Marquee Club. The cover image is inspired by the Sacred Heart of Jesus. It features the exclusive release of "Bombay Vindaloo", an improvisation-based composition performed live only six times and never recorded in a studio. "The Killing Hand" is preceded by an instrumental titled "Another Hand", written on tour specifically to bridge from the ending of "Another Day" (which always preceded it in the setlist). Most of James LaBrie's vocals were actually re-recorded in a studio.

Track listing
All music by Dream Theater.

Actual set list
(from Portnoy's concert database):

Metropolis Part I
A Fortune in Lies
Under a Glass Moon (not released)
Surrounded
Ytse Jam (w/ Drum Solo) (not released)
Bombay Vindaloo
Another Day (only released in Japan, replacing "Surrounded")
Another Hand
The Killing Hand
Pull Me Under
Take the Time (not released)

Encore
Wait for Sleep (not released)
Learning to Live (not released)
Twin Peaks (Outro Tape)

Personnel
Dream Theater
James LaBrie - vocals
Kevin Moore - keyboards
John Myung - bass
John Petrucci - guitars
Mike Portnoy - drums

Production
Tim Summerhayes - recording engineer
Vinnie Kowalski - live sound engineer
Doug Oberkircher - mixing at BearTracks Studios, Suffern, New York and Quad Sound Studios, New York City
Ted Jensen - mastering at Sterling Sound, New York City

Charts

References

Dream Theater live albums
1993 live albums
Atco Records live albums
Live albums recorded at The Marquee Club